John Barleycorn is a lost 1914 silent film drama produced and directed by Hobart Bosworth. It was distributed through State Rights and W. W. Hodkinson.

Cast
Elmer Clifton - Jack, 3rd period
Antrim Short - Jack, 2nd period
Matty Roubert - Jack, 1st period
Viola Barry - Haydee
Hobart Bosworth - Scratch Nelson
Joe Ray - 
Elmo Lincoln - 
Dick La Reno - 
Rhea Haines -

References

External links

1914 films
American silent feature films
Lost American films
Films based on American novels
Films based on works by Jack London
American black-and-white films
Silent American drama films
1914 drama films
1914 lost films
Lost drama films
1910s American films